Kuzmichi is a rural locality (a selo) in Znamensky Selsoviet of Romnensky District, Amur Oblast, Russia. The population was 21 as of 2018. There is 1 street.

Geography 
Kuzmichi is located on the left bank of the Belaya River, 25 km southwest of Romny (the district's administrative centre) by road. Znamenka is the nearest rural locality.

References 

Rural localities in Romnensky District